Älvsborg County was a county of Sweden until 1997, when it was merged with the counties of Gothenburg & Bohus and Skaraborg to form Västra Götaland County.

The county corresponded to the traditional province of Dalsland and the central part of the province of Västergötland, and its coat of arms was created by  quartering the respective arms of those provinces.

Älvsborg County initially encompassed the entire western half of Västergötland, and was named after Älvsborg Castle, which is where the county administration was initially based. Älvsborg was demolished in the 1660s and the county seat moved to nearby Gothenburg, but the county continued to bear the name Älvsborg. Under the 1658 Treaty of Roskilde, the Norwegian province of Bohuslen was transferred to Sweden, and in 1680 it was decided to form a new county comprising Bohuslän and the western part of Västergötland, creating the new Gothenburg and Bohus County. 

The seat of Älvsborg County (which had become even more of a misnomer, as the site of the former Älvsborg fortress now lay within the new Gothenburg and Bohus County) therefore had to be moved again, this time to Vänersborg.

See also
 List of governors of Älvsborg County
 List of governors of Gothenburg and Bohus County
 List of governors of Skaraborg County
 List of Västra Götaland Governors
 County Governors of Sweden

References

Västra Götaland County
Former counties of Sweden
1634 establishments in Sweden
1997 disestablishments in Sweden